Grün-Weiß Dankersen-Minden, commonly known as GWD Minden, is a handball club from Minden, Germany, and is competing in the German Handball-Bundesliga.

Crest, colours, supporters

Kits

Accomplishments
National Championship of Germany: 2
 : 1971, 1977
2. Handball-Bundesliga: 5
 : 1982, 1995, 2012
National Cup of Germany: 3
 : 1975, 1976, 1979

Team

Staff
Staff for the 2022–23 season

Current squad
Squad for the 2022–23 season

Goalkeeper
 1  Carsten Lichtlein
 55  Yahav Shamir
Wingers
LW
 5  Florian Kranzmann
 11  Mats Korte
RW
 27  Max Staar
 50  Tomáš Urban
Pivots
 6  Justus Nicolas Richtzenhain
 39  Carles Asensio Cambra

Back players
LB
 4  Maximilian Janke
 31  Marko Vignjević
 77  Fynn Hermeling
  Philipp Ahouansou
CB
 24  Magnus Holpert
 71  Mohamed Darmoul
RB
 7  Christian Zeitz
 9  Ole Günther
 40  Luka Šebetić

Transfers
Transfers for the 2023–24 season

 Joining
  Bjarni Valdimarsson (LB) (from  IFK Skövde)

 Leaving
  Philipp Ahouansou (LB) (end of loan from  Rhein-Neckar Löwen)

References

External links
 Official website

German handball clubs
Handball-Bundesliga
Minden
Handball clubs established in 1924
1924 establishments in Germany
Sport in North Rhine-Westphalia